The 2010 Australian Film Institute Awards ceremony, presented by the Australian Film Institute (AFI), honoured the best Australian films of 2010 and took place on 11 December 2010 at the Regent Theatre, in Melbourne, Victoria.

The Australian Film Institute announced the nominees competing for awards in forty-eight categories, in feature film, television, short film and documentaries, on 27 October 2010. Animal Kingdom received eighteen nominations, the most of any film in the awards' history. On the awards night, Animal Kingdom picked up the most awards, with ten, including Best Film.

Winners and nominees
The nominees were announced on 27 October 2010, at the Sydney Theatre, in Dawes Point, New South Wales, by actors Jacki Weaver, Cate Blanchett, Gyton Grantley and Alex Dimitriades. Animal Kingdom received the most nominations, with eighteen, becoming the most nominated film in the awards history. Animal Kingdom received the most awards, with ten, including Best Film, and Best Direction and Best Original Screenplay for David Michôd. Other feature film winners were Bright Star with three, Tomorrow, When the War Began, with two awards, and Beneath Hill 60 with one. Some of the award categories in film, television, documentary and short film genres, for sound, editing, cinematography, music and television programs, were presented one day prior to the awards ceremony.

Special awards
Raymond Longford Award
Reg Grundy

Byron Kennedy Award
Animal Logic

Outstanding Achievement in Short Film Screen Craft
The Kiss – Nick Matthews for cinematography

See also
AACTA Awards

References

External links
The Australian Academy of Cinema and Television Arts Official website

Film
A
AFI